Chrysina boucardi is a species of scarab beetle found in Costa Rica.

References 

Rutelinae
Beetles of Central America